What Dreams May Come is a 1998 American fantasy drama film directed by Vincent Ward and adapted by Ronald Bass from the 1978 novel of the same name by Richard Matheson. Starring Robin Williams, Annabella Sciorra, and Cuba Gooding Jr., it won the Academy Award for Best Visual Effects and the Art Directors Guild Award for Excellence in Production Design. It was also nominated for the Academy Award for Best Art Direction. The title is from a line in Hamlets "To be, or not to be" soliloquy. The film received mixed reviews and was a box office failure.

Plot
While vacationing in Switzerland, pediatrician Chris Nielsen meets artist Annie Collins. They marry and have two children, Ian and Marie. Their idyllic life ends when the children die in a car crash. Four years later, Chris is also killed in a car crash. Unaware that he is dead, and confused that no one will interact with him, Chris lingers on Earth.

He sees Annie's attempts to cope with his loss and attempts to communicate with her, despite advice from a presence that this will only cause her more pain. When his attempts indeed cause more sorrow, he decides to move on. Chris awakens in a Heaven that he has created with his imagination; his surroundings are a mountainous landscape that resembles a painting created by his wife, and is similar to a place where the two desired to spend their old age.

Chris is accompanied in Heaven by Albert Lewis, his friend and mentor from his medical residency, and Leona, a stewardess whom Chris once admired in the presence of his daughter; he later comes to recognize Leona as his daughter Marie. Meanwhile, Annie is wracked with guilt for the deaths of Chris and their children, and commits suicide. Chris, who is initially relieved that her suffering is over, grows angry when he learns that those who die by suicide go to Hell; this is not the result of a judgment made against them, but rather their own tendency to create nightmare afterlife worlds based on their pain.

Chris is adamant that he will rescue Annie from Hell, despite Albert's insistence that no one has ever succeeded in doing so with someone who died by suicide. Aided by a "tracker", Chris and Albert descend into Hell. On the journey there, Chris realizes that Albert is actually Ian and parts ways with him before his search for Annie.

Chris and the tracker arrive at a dark and twisted version of Chris and Annie's house. The tracker then reveals himself as the real Albert and warns Chris that if he stays with Annie for more than a few minutes he may be permanently trapped in Hell, advising that all Chris can reasonably expect is an opportunity for a final farewell to Annie. Chris enters their now-horrific looking home to find Annie suffering from amnesia, unable to remember her suicide, and visibly tortured by her decrepit surroundings. Unable to stir her memories, the tracker sees Chris give up his quest to save Annie from Hell.

But instead of returning to Heaven, Chris chooses to join Annie forever in Hell. As he declares to Annie his intent to stay, his words parallel something he had said to her as he left her in an institution following the children's deaths, and she regains her memories while Chris is making her nightmare his. Annie, wanting to save Chris, ascends to Heaven, taking Chris with her. Chris and Annie are reunited with their children in Heaven, and all appearances are restored. Chris proposes reincarnation, so he and Annie can experience life together again. The film ends with Chris and Annie meeting again as young children in a situation that parallels their first meeting.

Cast
 Robin Williams as Dr. Christopher James "Chris" Nielsen
 Cuba Gooding Jr. as Albert Lewis / Ian Nielsen
 Annabella Sciorra as Annie Collins-Nielsen
 Max von Sydow as The Tracker / Albert Lewis
 Jessica Brooks Grant as Marie Nielsen
 Josh Paddock as Ian Nielsen
 Rosalind Chao as Leona / Marie Nielsen
 Lucinda Jenney as Mrs. Jacobs
 Maggie McCarthy as Stacey Jacobs

Additionally, director Werner Herzog has a cameo as one of the Faces of the Damned.

Production
Principal photography for What Dreams May Come began in late June 1997. It was shot largely on Fuji Velvia film and is one of few films to have been shot in this manner. Fuji Velvia film is known among landscape photographers for its vivid color reproduction. The visual effects developments were created by Mass.lllusions in the same group that developed the bullet time visual effects in The Matrix.

Filming locations include places in Marin County, Alameda County, Glacier National Park, and Angel Falls. Part of the "Hell" sequence was filmed on the decrepit hull of the Essex class aircraft carrier USS Oriskany (CV-34) while berthed at Mare Island in Vallejo, California. The ship was later sunk to make an artificial reef on May 17, 2006.

The original prints of the film were lost in a fire at Universal Studios' backlot on June 1, 2008. A worldwide search was launched for a copy, which was found in Europe.

The special edition DVD and the 2011 Blu-ray show an alternate ending—the ending from the novel—in which reincarnation is not a choice, but part of the natural order. Chris and Annie will meet again in their new lives, but Annie must atone for killing herself—her new incarnation will die young, and Chris will spend the remainder of this life as a widower before the two are again reunited in Heaven. The film then goes to Sri Lanka where a woman is giving birth to a girl, presumed to be Annie. In Philadelphia, a boy is born, presumably Chris.

Music
The musical score for What Dreams May Come was composed and conducted by Michael Kamen and produced by James Seymour Brett. Ennio Morricone had completed and recorded a full score for the film but, after editorial changes were made, his score was rejected and Kamen was hired in his place. Short on time, Kamen took the song "Beside You" from his band the New York Rock & Roll Ensemble's 1971 album Roll Over and adapted it as the film's main musical theme. With just over three weeks to write, record, and mix the score, Kamen took a more direct approach. "I was at an extremely profound juncture in my own life at that time, and the film produced a powerful and personal response in me," said Kamen. "I know, despite the mixed response to the film itself, that I accomplished one of my best and most focused scores."

The score was performed by the London Metropolitan Orchestra and recorded at both Air Studios and Abbey Road Studios. A soundtrack album was released on October 13, 1998 by Beyond Records.

Differences from the novel
The film differs significantly from the novel, in its plot and its vision of the afterlife.

In the novel, there are far more references to Theosophical, New Age and paranormal beliefs. The author Richard Matheson claims in an introductory note that only the characters are fictional, and that most everything else is based on research (the book includes an extensive bibliography). Story elements that do not show up in the film include astral projection, telepathy, a séance, and the term "Summerland" (a name for a simplified Heaven in Theosophy, and for Heaven in general in religions such as Wicca).

The details of Chris's life on Earth differ strongly in the novel. Only Chris and his wife (called Ann) die. Their children, who are grownups rather than youngsters, remain alive, as minor characters. Albert and Leona are the people they appear to be, and the character played by Max Von Sydow does not appear in the book. Albert is Chris's cousin rather than simply a friend. Chris and Ann are rural types rather than the urbanites portrayed in the film, and he is not a pediatrician, nor is she a painter. He is a Hollywood screenwriter, and she has a variety of jobs.

In the book the afterlife imagery is based on natural scenery rather than paintings. The novel's depiction of Hell is considerably more violent than in the film. Chris finds it difficult to move, breathe, or see, and he suffers physical torture at the hands of some inhabitants. He does not encounter ships, thunderstorms, fire, or the sea of human faces that his film counterpart walks upon. Instead, he and Albert climb craggy cliffs and encounter such sights as a swarm of insects that attack people.

Ann is consigned to Hell for twenty four years, not eternity. At the end, which resembles an alternate version of the film but not the standard version, she escapes from Hell by being reincarnated, because she is not ready for Heaven.

Reception
The film was the second highest-grossing film at the U.S. box office in its opening week and went on to gross $55 million in the United States and Canada, while grossing a further $20 million internationally for a worldwide total of $75 million.

Upon its initial release, critical reception for What Dreams May Come was mixed. On Rotten Tomatoes, the film has an approval rating of 53%, based on 68 reviews, with an average score of 5.70/10. The site's critical consensus reads, "An insubstantial plot overshadows the beautiful, surreal scenery." On Metacritic, the film has a weighted average score of 44 out of 100, based on reviews from 25 critics, indicating "mixed or average reviews". Audiences surveyed by CinemaScore gave the film a grade "B" on a scale of A+ to F.

Roger Ebert of the Chicago Sun-Times awarded the film three and a half stars out of four, remarking: 

James Berardinelli of ReelViews gave What Dreams May Come three stars out of four, saying: 

Owen Gleiberman of Entertainment Weekly gave the film a C+, writing, "There's a central contradiction in a fairy tale like this one: the film may preach to the audience about matters of the spirit, but its bejeweled special-effects vision of the afterlife can't help but come off as aggressively literal-minded." Leonard Maltin, in his annual publication TV Movies, gave the film a "BOMB" rating, describing it as being "off-putting gobbledygook".

In an interview regarding adaptations of his work, Richard Matheson stated that "I will not comment on What Dreams May Come except to say that a major producer in Hollywood said to me, 'They should have shot your book.' Amen. I must add that the producer, Stephen Simon, tried to get my script filmed for many years so I can't fault him for finally having to go the route he did in order to get the film made."

Accolades

See also

 Descent to the underworld
 The Lovely Bones
 "To Be or Not To Be"
 List of films about angels

References

External links

 
 
 
 What Dreams May Come at Vincent Ward Films

1990s American films
1990s English-language films
1990s fantasy drama films
1990s romantic fantasy films
1998 films
1998 romantic drama films
American fantasy drama films
American romantic drama films
American romantic fantasy films
Films about grieving
Films about suicide
Films about the afterlife
Films based on American novels
Films based on fantasy novels
Films based on romance novels
Films based on works by Richard Matheson
Films directed by Vincent Ward
Films scored by Ennio Morricone
Films scored by Michael Kamen
Films set in Venezuela
Films that won the Best Visual Effects Academy Award
Films with screenplays by Ronald Bass
Heaven and hell films
Interscope Communications films
PolyGram Filmed Entertainment films